Piotr Firlej (died 1553) was a Polish nobleman (szlachcic).

Firlej married Katarzyna Teczynska and together they had three children: Jan Firlej, Mikołaj Firlej and Andrzej Firlej.

Piotr became voivode of Lublin Voivodship in 1537 and voivode of Ruthenian Voivodship in 1545. In 1514 he participated in the Battle of Orsza and was a trusted adviser of Queen Bona Sforza and King Zygmunt II August. He founded the cities of Janowiec and Lubartów and built castles there.

15th-century births
1553 deaths
Polish nobility
Piotr
Lublin Voivodes